Hodge Escarpment is an escarpment to the northeast of Henderson Bluff on the northwest side of Lexington Table, in the Forrestal Range of the Pensacola Mountains, Antarctica. It was named by the Advisory Committee on Antarctic Names for Steven M. Hodge, a United States Geological Survey geophysicist, who worked in the Dufek Massif and the Forrestal Range, 1978–79.

References

Escarpments of Queen Elizabeth Land